Laura Hallisey (born December 31, 1986) is a curler from Medfield, Massachusetts.

In 2005 Hallisey made her national debut at the United States Junior Championships. She would ultimately compete in four Junior Nationals, winning the silver medal in 2006 and 2007.

Hallisey competed in her first United States Women's Championship in 2009, which doubled as the Olympic Trials for the 2010 Vancouver Olympics. Competing as the lead for Erika Brown's team, they finished in fourth place.

Hallisey won her first US title, still on Brown's team, at the 2010 US Nationals in Kalamazoo, Michigan, earning the right to compete at the 2010 Swift Current World Championships.

Teams

Notes

References

External links

American female curlers
1986 births
Living people
American curling champions
21st-century American women